Smith's Landing First Nation is a band government headquartered at Fort Smith, Northwest Territories, Canada. Members of the band call themselves, in the Dene Suline language, the Thebati Dene Suhne.

Indian Reserves
The band has ten reserves located in Alberta.  These are:
 Ɂejëre Kelnı Kuę́ 196I (Hay Camp)
Hokédhe Kué 196E (Myers Lake)
Kı Kué 196D (Birch Lake)
Łı̨ Dezé 196C (Dog River)
Tthebacha Náre 196A (Border Town)
Tthebatthıe 196 (Fort Fitzgerald)
Tsu Kadhe Kué 196F (Leland Lake)
Tsu Nedhé 196H (Pine Lake)
Tsu Kué 196G (Charles Lake)
 196B (Salt River)

References

First Nations in the Northwest Territories
Dene governments
First Nations in Alberta